Yorkeys Crossing is a ford in the Australian state of  South Australia located at the head of Spencer Gulf in the gazetted locality of Emeroo about  north of Port Augusta. It is also near the location of the crossing (also known as Yorkey Crossing) for the Kalgoorlie to Port Augusta Railway (now called the Trans-Australian Railway) built after 1911. It is considered to be the most north easterly part of Eyre Peninsula and is popular with railway enthusiasts.

It is commonly known by the possessive 'Yorkey's Crossing', such as when mentioned in episode 3 of the 2020 ABC television drama Stateless.

References

Spencer Gulf
Eyre Peninsula
Trans-Australian Railway
Far North (South Australia)